Pablo Javier Pérez (born 10 August 1985) is an Argentine footballer who plays for Newell's Old Boys, as a midfielder.

Club career

Newell's Old Boys and loans
Born in Rosario, Pérez graduated from Newell's Old Boys' youth setup, and made his professional debut on 2 December 2006, in a 2–2 draw with Godoy Cruz. On 26 May of the following year, he scored his first goals as a professional, netting a hat-trick in a 4–4 draw with Estudiantes.

On 31 July 2009 Pérez moved abroad for the first time in his career, joining Ecuadorian Serie A side Emelec on loan until the end of the season. During his spell, he scored a goal from the midfield on 17 September, the last of a 4–0 home success against ESPOLI.

On 12 July 2010 Pérez moved to Unión de Santa Fe also in a temporary deal. After appearing in 31 matches and scoring three goals during his only season, he returned to Newell's in June 2011.

Pérez scored eight goals in his return campaign, and appeared regularly in the following two seasons, also being a part of the squad which won the 2013 Torneo Final. He also appeared in 2013 Copa Libertadores, but missed his side's last game due to suspension.

Málaga
On 8 January 2014, Pérez joined La Liga side Málaga CF on a three-and-a-half year deal. He made his debut in the competition on the 17th, replacing Samu in a 0–0 home draw against Valencia CF.

Pérez scored his first goal for the Andalusians on 25 March 2014, but in a 1–2 home loss against RCD Espanyol.

Boca Juniors
On 9 December 2014, Pérez was loaned to Boca Juniors back in his homeland for 18 months, with a buyout clause. The following 1 September, he was bought outright and signed a deal until 2019.

During the 2018 Copa Libertadores, Pérez acted as team captain as his side reached the finals, losing it to rivals River Plate.

In January 2019, he joined Independiente on loan.

International career
Pérez was called up by Argentina manager Jorge Sampaoli on 12 March 2018, for two friendlies against Italy and Spain. He made full international debut on 27 March, coming on as a second-half substitute for Éver Banega in a 6–1 loss against the latter at the Wanda Metropolitano in Madrid.

In May 2018, Pérez was named in Argentina's preliminary 35-man squad for the 2018 FIFA World Cup in Russia but did not make the final cut.

Career statistics

Club

International

Honours
Newell's Old Boys
Primera División: 2013 Final

Boca Juniors
Primera División: 2015, 2016–17
Copa Argentina: 2014–15

References

External links
 
 
 

1985 births
Living people
Footballers from Rosario, Santa Fe
Argentine footballers
Association football midfielders
Argentine Primera División players
Primera Nacional players
Newell's Old Boys footballers
Unión de Santa Fe footballers
Boca Juniors footballers
Ecuadorian Serie A players
C.S. Emelec footballers
La Liga players
Málaga CF players
Club Atlético Independiente footballers
Argentina international footballers
Argentine expatriate footballers
Argentine expatriate sportspeople in Ecuador
Argentine expatriate sportspeople in Spain
Expatriate footballers in Ecuador
Expatriate footballers in Spain